The 1962 Hawaii gubernatorial election was Hawaii's second gubernatorial election.  The election was held on November 6, 1962, and resulted in a victory for the Democratic candidate, former Territorial Delegate John A. Burns over Republican William F. Quinn, the incumbent Governor of Hawaii.  The election was a rematch between the candidates of the previous election, with the outcome reversed.  Burns received more votes than Quinn in every county in the state.

This election was the first of ten consecutive Democratic gubernatorial victories in Hawaii, a streak not broken until the election of Republican Linda Lingle in 2002.

Primaries
William F. Quinn experienced a contested Republican primary against Lt. Gov. James Kealoha, winning 57.06%-42.94%.  Burns faced only nominal opposition in the Democratic primary, receiving 90.19% of the vote.

General election

References

1962
Gubernatorial
1962 United States gubernatorial elections
November 1962 events in the United States